The Monument "Tank T-34" Matveev Kurgan is a Russian monument located near the village of Matveev Kurgan.

History 
On May 9, 1972  Tank T-34 was installed at the entrance to the settlement of Matveev Kurgan  in honor of the 27th  anniversary of the end of the Great Patriotic War in memory of the feat of the tankmen of the 44th  Army  that participated in the liberation of the village Matveev Kurgan in  February 1943.  After the defeat of the German fascist troops at Stalingrad, the Soviet Army began the offensive in many directions.  On February 14, 1943, the troops of the Southern Front liberated Rostov-on-Don.  The task was to come to the river Mius by  February 17, to occupy the district centre of Matveev Kurgan and the heights on the western bank of the Mius.  Thus, the residents of Matveev Kurgan immortalized a feat of the Hero of the Soviet Union, lieutenant Alexander Matveevich Eroshin (he began his glorious military career as the commander of the tank T-34), the tank commander of the 37th  Guards Tank Regiment, he was the first who at high speed broke into the night of February 17, 1943  on a tank in the village and started the battle for its liberation. Guard - Lieutenant Eroshin A.M. didn’t  allow the enemy to blow up the railway bridge over the Oktyabrskaya street. The crew of the tank destroyed more than a  company of the enemy in this battle.  In 1968  Eroshin A.M. was given the title of "Honorary Citizen of the Settlement of Matveev Kurgan".  Until his last days he kept in touch with residents of the district.  Eroshin A.M.  died in May 2003.  He was buried in Moscow.

Description of the monument: the pedestal of the monument is made of stone. The original T-34 tank is installed there. The tank (with a tankman in it) drove up on the pedestal itself.

Sources 
 "Monuments of military glory of Matveevo-Kurgan district" brief tourist information on the tourist route; L.A.Esina; 2016
 Pugaev G.K. Years and people. Historical records; Taganrog, 2010, 212 p.
 Pugaev G.K. Blood and glory of the Mius; Taganrog, 1988, 208 p.

External links 
 Matveev Kurgan regional studies museum (in Russian)
 Matveev Kurgan authority (in Russian)

Tourist attractions in Rostov Oblast
World War II memorials in Russia
Monuments and memorials in Rostov Oblast